John or Jack Leonard may refer to:

John Leonard (songwriter), early 19th century radical poet and songwriter, probably born in Gateshead
John Leonard (critic) (1939–2008), American literary, television, film, and cultural critic
John Leonard (poet) (born 1965), Australian poet
John Leonard (Gaelic footballer) (born 1976), Gaelic footballer
John Leonard (canoeist) (born 1948), New Zealand sprint canoeist
John Leonard (judge) (1926–2002), British judge
Johnny Leonard (1903–1995), Australian rules footballer
John B. Leonard (1864–1945), American civil engineer
John J. Leonard, American roboticist and professor at MIT
Jack Leonard (footballer) (1876–?), English footballer
Jack Leonard (hurler) (1873–1938), Irish hurler
Jack E. Leonard (1910–1973), American comedian and actor
John E. Leonard (1845–1878), United States Representative from Louisiana
J. William Leonard, director of the Information Security Oversight Office
John Leonardi (1541–1609), Catholic saint whose feast day is on 9 October
John Leonard (bishop) (1829–1908), Irish bishop
John W. Leonard (1890–1974), US Army general
John Leonard, Baron Leonard (1909–1983), British Labour Party politician
John Leonard (ice hockey), (born 1998), American ice hockey player
John Leonard (architect), English architect

See also

John Lennard (disambiguation)